Stanley Martin Clarke  (born August 9, 1960) is a former pitcher in Major League Baseball. He spent parts of six seasons in the major leagues with the Toronto Blue Jays, Seattle Mariners, Kansas City Royals, and St. Louis Cardinals.

A native of Toledo, Ohio, Clarke attended Woodward High School and the University of Toledo. In 1980, he played collegiate summer baseball with the Wareham Gatemen of the Cape Cod Baseball League. He was selected by the Toronto Blue Jays in the sixth round of the 1981 MLB Draft.

References

External links
, or Retrosheet, or Pura Pelota (Venezuelan Winter League)

1960 births
Living people
American expatriate baseball players in Canada
Baseball players from Ohio
Calgary Cannons players
Cardenales de Lara players
American expatriate baseball players in Venezuela
Florence Blue Jays players
Kansas City Royals players
Knoxville Blue Jays players
Louisville Redbirds players
Major League Baseball pitchers
Medicine Hat Blue Jays players
Omaha Royals players
Seattle Mariners players
Sportspeople from Toledo, Ohio
St. Louis Cardinals players
Syracuse Chiefs players
Tiburones de La Guaira players
Toledo Rockets baseball players
Toronto Blue Jays players
Wareham Gatemen players